Tom Kirk (1916–1994) was an Australian professional rugby league footballer who played in the 1930s and 1940s. A New South Wales state representative goal-kicking fullback, he played in Sydney's NSWRFL for the Canterbury-Bankstown and Newtown clubs (with whom he won premierships) as well as with North Sydney. He was the first player to become the season's top point scorer on 5 occasions: 1938, 1940, 1943, 1944, 1946.  In 1947 he became the first player to score 1,000 career points in the NSWRFL.

Playing career
Former fullback of Tumut's Maher Cup team, Kirk moved to Sydney and first tasted premiership success with Canterbury's 1938 Grand Final-winning team, landing four goals in the 19–6 win over Easts in the final. That year he also topped the competition's point-scorers list and the following year made his debut for NSW in the centres.

Joining Newtown, Kirk became the first player to kick 100 goals in a season in 1943, including five in the 34–7 win over Norths in the premiership decider. He was the season's leading point scorer on five occasions, the last in 1946.

He twice kicked a club record 11 goals during the 1944 NSWRFL season and set Newtown's club record for most points in a match with 25 (1 try and 11 goals) against St George, on 26 August 1944.

In 1946 he overtook Arthur Oxford's record for the most points scored in an NSWRFL career (864); Kirks's eventual total of 1,042 stood as the new career record for thirteen seasons until it was bettered by Bernie Purcell in 1959.

In 1947, Kirk joined North Sydney for his last season in Sydney, and made a return to the New South Wales side in his final year in the Sydney competition.

He finished his playing career at Barmedman, New South Wales in 1948.

Kirk died in March 1994 aged 77.

References

External links
Newtown stats at rleague.com

1916 births
1994 deaths
City New South Wales rugby league team players
Newtown Jets players
Canterbury-Bankstown Bulldogs players
North Sydney Bears players
New South Wales rugby league team players
Rugby league fullbacks